King Mellow Yellow (born in Kingston, Jamaica) was or is  a Jamaican Dancehall DJ. Being one of three popular albino DJs in the 1980s (Yellowman, Purpleman and King Mellow Yellow), in song, he often referred to himself as "The Yellow Hands".

Career
In 1981, King Mellow Yellow began recording his first album. It released one year later in 1982 in Jamaica on the Jamrock label. Later that year, he released King Mellow Yellow Meet Yellowman, a clash album with another albino DJ Yellowman.
In 1983 and 1984, Mellow Yellow released more singles with other artists and by himself. Some of those artists include Sammy Dread and Fathead.

12" Discos

References
Mellow Yellow on Roots Knotty Roots

Jamaican DJs
Jamaican musicians
Jamaican songwriters
People with albinism
Living people
Year of birth missing (living people)
Musicians from Kingston, Jamaica